De Falco is a surname. Notable persons with that name include:

 Andrea De Falco (born 1986), Italian footballer
 Giuseppe De Falco (1908–1955), Italian politician
 Gregorio de Falco (born 1965), Italian naval officer and politician
 Lawrence Michael De Falco (1915–1979), American Catholic bishop
 Luigi De Falco (born 1976), Italian businessman
 Marcel De Falco (born 1962), French footballer
 Michele de Falco, Italian composer
 Rubens de Falco (1931–2008), Brazilian actor
 Tom DeFalco (born 1950), American comic book writer and editor
 Torey DeFalco (born 1997), American volleyball player

See also 
 Falco (disambiguation)
 Falco (surname), a list of people with the surname Falco or Falcó